Lake Tinaroo is a rural locality in the Tablelands Region, Queensland, Australia.

Geography 
The locality includes the lake itself (also called Lake Tinaroo) created by the Tinaroo Dam and the foreshores of the lake and some of the creeks that flow into the lake. It is mostly a water locality with very little land.

Education 
Tinaroo Environmental Education Centre is an Outdoor and Environmental Education Centre at Black Gully Road.

References 

Tablelands Region
Localities in Queensland